Großmürbisch is a village in the district of Güssing in Burgenland in south-eastern Austria. The village was the home of Frank Hoffmann until his death in 2022.

Population

References

Cities and towns in Güssing District